, also known as , is an platform game released as an arcade video game by Sega in 1983. A message in the ROM indicates it was coded at least in part by the company Ikegami Tsushinki. The game is viewed in an isometric perspective, like Sega's earlier Zaxxon (1981), but does not scroll. Numerous home ports followed.

The player takes the role of a red-nosed safari explorer attempting to catch an ape named Bongo who set fire to the explorer's tent. The goal in each of the four screens is to move from the lower left corner to the location of the ape on the right or upper right. He must climb ledges, jump over water and gaps in the terrain, and avoid animal attackers.

Gameplay

Congo Bongo has similar elements and gameplay to Nintendo's Donkey Kong from 1981, with the isometric perspective from Sega's Zaxxon released in Japan in late 1981. Both Congo Bongo and Donkey Kong involve primates who throw objects at the player from a vantage point atop a structure. Both games involve a large-nosed protagonist whose only ability is to jump. Both games have four different, single-screen stages The goal of the first stage in both games is to climb to the top. Even the graphics of the bonus timer are similar to Donkey Kongs.

Stages
In the first stage, the hunter must avoid coconuts thrown by Bongo and he has to climb a series of cliffs to reach the ape, while at the same time shaking off three monkeys that try to throw the hunter off the mountain.
In the second stage, the hunter must cross a swamp platform by riding on the backs of diving and swimming hippopotamuses and avoiding both poisonous snakes and scorpions.
The third stage requires the hunter to cross a plain and crouch into holes to evade the horns of charging rhinoceroses, while climbing up large flights of stairs to proceed to the next area.
In the fourth and final stage, the hunter crosses a second swamp that with lily pads, fish, and hippos, to reach a gate of charging rhinos that are blocking the entrance to Bongo in a hot tub.

The game repeats from the first level with increased difficulty.

Ports
Congo Bongo was ported to the Apple II, SG-1000, MSX, Intellivision, ColecoVision, Commodore 64 (first as a cartridge, then later to disk), VIC-20, IBM PC, Atari 2600, Atari 5200, Atari 8-bit family, and the TI-99/4A. Sega's ports for the Atari 2600, 5200, Atari 8-bit, Intellivision, and Commodore 64 (cartridge version) include two of the four levels from the arcade original, while the ColecoVision release is missing the "Snake Lake" level.

The Atari 2600 version was released in March 1984. The ColecoVision version was released in October 1984.

Reception
In Japan, Game Machine listed Congo Bongo on their June 15, 1983 issue as being the fifth most-successful table arcade unit of the month. In the United States, Time magazine initially reported in 1983 that the arcade game was a commercial failure, before it went on to become a popular arcade game according to Computer Games magazine in early 1985. The game went on to have a number of home conversions, which were commercially successful in the United States.

Computer and Video Games magazine gave the arcade game a generally favorable review. They called its concept of Donkey Kong (1981) "in three dimensions" a "fascinating idea" while also noting the final level has similarities to Frogger (1981).

The home conversions received a mixed reception. The ColecoVision, Atari 5200 and Intellivision versions were awarded "Best Videogame Audio-Visual Effects" at the 1984 Arkie Awards. Ahoy! in 1984 stated that Congo Bongo for the Commodore 64 and VIC-20 "is fraught with problems; gameplay is repetitive, frustrating, tedious, inconsistent, and at times confusing, and the music not only got on my nerves but stomped on them. Plus, the whole thing is derivative". Computer Games magazine gave the Atari VCS version a C− rating, calling the "VCS version of" the arcade game, "for the most part, a disappointment." ST. Game readers named the Atari version of the game the worst Atari program of 1983, even worse than the notorious E.T. the Extra-Terrestrial.

Legacy
The original arcade release is included in the PlayStation Portable version of Sega Genesis Collection (as an unlockable game) and Sonic's Ultimate Genesis Collection for Xbox 360 and PlayStation 3. An enhanced remake was released for the PlayStation 2 under the Sega Ages label as a part of Sega Ages 2500 Series Vol. 23: Sega Memorial Selection.

Notes

References

External links

Congo Bongo  at Phosphor Dot Fossils

1983 video games
Apple II games
Arcade video games
Atari 2600 games
Atari 5200 games
Atari 8-bit family games
Cancelled ZX Spectrum games
ColecoVision games
Commodore 64 games
Intellivision games
MSX games
Multiplayer and single-player video games
Multiplayer hotseat games
Platform games
Gremlin Industries games
Sega arcade games
Sega video games
SG-1000 games
TI-99/4A games
Vertically-oriented video games
VIC-20 games
Video games about primates
Video games developed in Japan
Video games with isometric graphics
Video games with oblique graphics